Guillermo Rojas Rumilla (born 29 March 1983) is a Mexican former football winger. He last played for Cafetaleros de Tapachula of the Liga MX. Rojas made his professional debut with Puebla in 2003. He is considered to be one of the fastest footballers in the world.

He was selected by José Guadalupe Cruz as one of the squad members for 2009 FIFA Club World Cup. He played the first match against Auckland City FC, game which Atlante won 3–0. Days later, Atlante would have to face FC Barcelona. Rojas' scored his first goal in official competitions, but Atlante lost the match 1–3.

Rojas' incredible speed was reportedly first noticed by a school teacher when Rojas had been chasing after a boy who tried to steal his football. The teacher then placed Rojas on the school athletics, football and baseball teams. The school which Rojas attended claim that he ran a 100m sprint in a time of 10.76 at the age of 12. If true, this would still be a Mexican record for that particular age group to this day.

In 2013, Rojas acquired the nickname "The Freak" because of his blazing speed. In EA's FIFA 13, Rojas was the fastest player in the game along with Theo Walcott and Jonathan Biabiany.

Honours
CONCACAF Champions' Cup / CONCACAF Champions League
Winners (1):, 2008-09

References

External links

1983 births
Living people
Footballers from San Luis Potosí
Association football midfielders
Liga MX players
Club Puebla players
C.F. Monterrey players
C.D. Veracruz footballers
Atlante F.C. footballers
Chiapas F.C. footballers
Atlas F.C. footballers
San Luis F.C. players
Club Necaxa footballers
Mexican footballers